Kendal is a regency in the northern part of Central Java province in Indonesia, west of Semarang. Its capital is Kendal. The regency is bordered by the Java Sea in the north, Semarang City and Semarang Regency in the east, Temanggung Regency in the south, and Batang Regency in the west. Kendal Regency was established on 28 July 1605. Kendal is also known as the City of Santri because there are thousands of Ponpes, especially in Kaliwungu District and also known as the City of Arts and Culture. The regency covers an area of 1,001.73 km2 and had a population of 900,313 at the 2010 census and 1,018,505 at the 2020 census, consisting of 514,795 (50.55%) males and 503,710 (49.45%) females.

History
The name Kendal is taken from the name of a tree, the Kendal Tree. No one at first knew his name, but when Pakuwojo hid in the tree in the tree it was brightly lit, finally the tree was called the Qondhali tree, which means lighting, and finally the area where the tree was called Qondhali was because Javanese were not fluent in Arabic and became Kendal. The lush leafy tree has been known since the time of the Demak Kingdom in 1500-1546 AD that was during the reign of Sultan Trenggono. At the beginning of his reign in 1521, Sultan Trenggono once ruled Sunan Katong to order heirlooms to Pakuwojo. The events that caused the conflict and resulted in the death were recorded in the Inscription. Even now, the tomb of the two figures in Kendal's history in Protomulyo Village, Kaliwungu District, is still widely sacred to the community. According to the story, Sunan Katong was stunned by the beauty and longing of Kendal trees that grew in the surrounding environment. While enjoying the view of the Kendal tree that looks "sari", He mentioned that in the area later it would be called "Kendalsari". The big tree that the people mentioned was located on the edge of Kendal Youth Street was also known as Kendal Growing because the stem was hollow or growing.

A young man named Joko Bahu is a court servant of the Mataram kingdom. Joko Bahu is known as someone who loves others and is a hard worker until Joko Bahu succeeded in advancing his area. For this success, Sultan Agung Adi Prabu Hanyokrokusumo finally appointed him as the Kendal Regent, entitled Tumenggung Bahurekso. In addition Tumenggung Bahurekso was also appointed as Commander of the Mataram War on August 26, 1628, to lead tens of thousands of soldiers to invade the VOC in Batavia. In the battle on 21 October 1628 in Batavia Tumenggung Bahurekso and his two sons died as Kusuma Bangsa. From the journey of Sang Tumenggung Bahurekso led the VOC attack in Batavia on August 26, 1628, which was then used as a benchmark for the history of the birth of Kendal Regency. Further development with the momentum of the death of Tumenggung Bahurekso as the determination of the anniversary was considered by some to be inappropriate. Because the momentum is a dark history for a character named Bahurekso. So if the date is taken as the momentum of the anniversary is feared it will bring psychological effects. The emergence of the term "fail and fall" in Javanese mythology is feared to form psychological biases that influence the behavior of the pattern of taste, creativity and intentions of the people of Kendal Regency, so that it feels inappropriate if used as a sign of the beginning of the emergence of Kendal Regency. From the results of the Seminar held on August 15, 2006, by inviting experts and historical actors, such as Prof. Dr. Djuliati Suroyo (professor of the Undip Semarang Faculty of Literature), Dr. Wasino, M.Hum (Unnes Postgraduate lecturer) H. Moenadi (Kendal Community Leader with moderator Dr. Singgih Tri Sulistiyono. And after a comprehensive study and assessment agreed and concluded that the momentum of Bahurekso's appointment as Kendal Regent was used as the starting point for the day so the appointment coincides on 12 Rabiul Awal 1014 H or 28 July 1605. The date is exactly Thursday Legi Friday night pahing 1527 Saka. Determination of the anniversary is then determined through the Kendal Regency Regional Regulation (PERDA) Number 20 of 2006, concerning the Determination of the Day So Kendal Regency (Local Gazette number 20 of 2006 Series E number 15) Kendal history is also found in the library of Leiden University, Leiden, Netherlands.

Kaliwungu has triumphed as the center of government since the inception of Kendal Regency. However, due to the political conditions in the center of Mataram at that time and the consideration of the development of the government, the center of government moved to Kendal City until now. So that finally Kaliwungu is only used for the residence of the father of the Regent, who is often referred to as Kasepuhan. Whereas the government was made an administrative area namely Kaliwungu District.

During the New Order era, the regency was the site of the Plantungan concentration camp, where former Communist Party and Gerwani members were imprisoned from 1971 to 1979.

Government

Administrative Districts
Kendal Regency consists of twenty districts (kecamatan), tabulated below with their areas and their populations at the 2010 census, and the 2020 census. The table also includes the number of administrative villages (rural desa and urban keluraham) in each district and its post code.

Note: (a) except one desa (Karangsari) for which the post code is 51354.

Kendal town is the administrative headquarters. Besides Kendal, other significant district centres are Kaliwungu, Boja and Weleri. Kendal Regency has a coastline with a length of 41.0 kilometres.

In general, the Kendal Regency region is divided into two distinct areas, namely lowland areas (beaches) and highland areas (mountains). The northern region of Kendal Regency is a low-lying area with an altitude between 0–10 metres above sea level, which includes the districts of Weleri, Rowosari, Kale, Cepiring, Gemuh, Ringinarum, Pegandon, Sampling, Patebon, Kendal, Brangsong, and Kaliwungu.

The southern part of Kendal Regency is a highland area consisting of mountainous land with an altitude between 10 and 2,579 metres above sea level, covering the districts of Plantungan, Pageruyung, Sukorejo, Patean, Boja, Singorojo, Limbangan and Kaliwungu Selatan.

List of Regents

List of Vice Regents

Sport 
Kendal has a soccer club. That is Persik Kendal. Kendal Stadium is the Bahurekso Stadium.  The Stadium is located in Kebondalem Village Kendal City. And some Volleyball clubs at the Krida Bahurekso Gym.

Industry
One of the Industries in Kendal is Kendal Industrial Estate in Kaliwungu District and Sugar Factory in Cepiring District. The Sugar Factory in Cepiring has existed  since the Dutch era. 
  Sugar Factory in Cepiring In Dutch era.

Tourism

Natural Tourism
 Ngebum Beach. Located In Kaliwungu
 Curug Sewu / Sewu Waterfall. Located in Patean 
 Jeglong Waterfall. Located in Plantungan
 Cacaban Tourism Village. Located in Singorojo 
 Sekatul Agrotourism. Located in Limbangan 
 Muara Kencan beach. Located in Patebon
 Ngebruk Fruit Garden in Patean.
 Sendang Sikucing. Located in Rowosari
 Semawur Waterfall. Located in Plantungan
 Kiskendo Cave. Located in Singorojo
 Penglebur Gongso Waterfall. Located in Limbangan
 Selo Arjuno Hill. Located in Limbangan
 Tiban Island Tourism in Patebon.
 Gonoharjo Hot Spring. Located in Limbangan
 Medini Tea Plantation. Located in Limbangan
  Sewu Waterfall/ Curug Sewu

Religious Tourism
 Wali Joko's Grave. Located in Kendal Mosque Complex 
 Wali Hadi's Grave. Located in Kendal Mosque Complex
 The Tomb of Prince Djoeminah. Located in Kaliwungu
 Tomb of Sunan Bromo. Located in Boja
 Kyai Asyari's Grave. Located in Kaliwungu
 Wali Gembyang's Grave. Located in Kendal City
 The Tomb of Habib Mansyur Al Munawar. Located in Kendal City

Event
 Kendal Expo in Kebondalem Village. Kendal City 
 Nyadran. In Kendal Coast 
 Syawalan. In Kaliwungu and Boja

Famous Figure
 dr. Mirna Annisa ( Regent of Kendal 2016 - 2021 ) 
 dr. Widya Kandi Susanti ( Regent of Kendal 2010 - 2015 ) 
 Don Murdono ( Regent of Sumedang 2003 - 2013 ) 
 H Tino Indra Wardono ( Chairperson of Central Java KNPI )
 Alamuddin Dimyati Rois ( Member of the House of Representatives )
 KH Ahmad Rifai ( Heroes of Struggle and Kyai ).
 Tumenggung Bahurekso ( First Regent of Kendal 1605 - 1629 )
 Bambang Irawan ( Actor and Director Film )

Typical Culinary

Food
 Mangut Lele 
 Telur Ikan Mimi (Mimi Fish Eggs)
 Soto Kendal 
 Momoh 
 Sate Bumbon (Bumbon Satay)
 Brongkos
 Bebek Ijo (Green Fried Duck) 
 Rica Rica Menthog 
 Pecel Kembang Turi
 Krupuk Petis (Crackers)
 Rambak (Crackers)
 Rambak

Drink
 Kopi Cacaban (Cacaban Coffee)
 Bir Jawa (Java Beer)
 Dawet Sukun Ireng

Gallery

References

Regencies of Central Java